James Watson Webb may refer to:

James Watson Webb (1802–1884), diplomat, newspaper publisher and a New York politician
James Watson Webb II (1884–1960), American polo champion
J. Watson Webb, Jr. (1916–2000), American film editor